is the 22nd single by Japanese singer Yōko Oginome. Written by Masumi Kawamura and Toshinobu Kubota, the single was released on June 5, 1991 by Victor Entertainment.

Background and release
"Bijo to Yajū" peaked at No. 20 on Oricon's singles chart and sold over 31,000 copies.

Track listing

Charts

References

External links

1991 singles
Yōko Oginome songs
Japanese-language songs
Victor Entertainment singles